Rhopalopterum is a genus of frit flies in the family Chloropidae. There are about 10 described species in Rhopalopterum.

Species
 Rhopalopterum atriceps (Loew, 1863)
 Rhopalopterum beameri (Sabrosky, 1940)
 Rhopalopterum carbonaria (Loew, 1869)
 Rhopalopterum criddlei (Aldrich, 1918)
 Rhopalopterum limitatum (Becker, 1912)
 Rhopalopterum luteiceps (Sabrosky, 1940)
 Rhopalopterum nudiusculum (Loew, 1863)
 Rhopalopterum painteri (Sabrosky, 1940)
 Rhopalopterum soror (Macquart, 1851)
 Rhopalopterum umbrosa (Loew, 1863)

References

Further reading

External links

 Diptera.info

Oscinellinae